The Cyprus Internet Exchange (CyIX) is an Internet exchange point that was created in 1999 by the Cyprus Institute of Technology and three founding members Cytanet, LogosNet and CyLink (now part of PrimeTel). CyIX has been hosted in CYNET (Cyprus Research and Education Network) premises for over a decade. CYNET is the NREN (National Research & Education Network) of Cyprus.

See also 
 List of Internet exchange points

References

External links 
 Cablenet Website
 CytaNet Website
 LogosNet Website
 CyLink Website
 CYNET Website

Telecommunications companies of Cyprus
Internet exchange points in Europe
1999 establishments in Cyprus